Hector Uisdean MacKenzie, Baron MacKenzie of Culkein (born 25 February 1940) is a Scottish nurse and former trade union official.

The son of George MacKenzie and Williamina Sutherland was educated on the Isle of Erraid Public School, in Argyll, the Aird Public School on the Isle of Lewis, the Nicolson Institute in Stornoway and the Portree High School in Skye. He went then to the Leverndale School of Nursing in Glasgow and the West Cumberland School of Nursing in Whitehaven. 
  	
MacKenzie was student nurse at the Leverndale Hospital from 1958 to  1961 and West Cumberland Hospital from 1964 to 1966. Since 1969, he had worked for the Confederation of Health Service Employees, first as assistant regional secretary, then from 1970 to 1974 as regional secretary for Yorkshire and East Midlands. He was national officer from 1974 to 1983, assistant general secretary from 1983 to 1987 and general secretary from 1987 to 1993.

MacKenzie is a member of UNISON, had been associate general secretary between 1993 and 2000.

In 1966 he received the Lindsay Robertson Gold Medal for Nurse of the Year, and in 1999 he was created a life peer as Baron MacKenzie of Culkein, of Assynt in Highland

Lord MacKenzie of Culkein was married to Anna Morrison from 1961 to 1991; they have one son and three daughters.

References

1940 births
Living people
General Secretaries of the Confederation of Health Service Employees
British trade union leaders
Members of the General Council of the Trades Union Congress
Presidents of the Trades Union Congress
Mackenzie of Culkein
People educated at Portree High School
People educated at the Nicolson Institute
Scottish nurses
Life peers created by Elizabeth II